Mirabella minensis, synonym Cereus mirabella, is a species of plant in the family Cactaceae. It is endemic to Brazil.  Its natural habitat is dry savanna. It is threatened by habitat loss.

References

Flora of Brazil
Cactoideae
Taxonomy articles created by Polbot